Ndèye Tické Ndiaye Diop is a Senegalese politician from Thiès. She became the Minister of Digital Economy and Telecommunication in April 2019.

Career
She is an engineer in fisheries technology. She carried out activities to support the population of Thiès, such as granting credits to women and investing in hygiene facilities. She was awarded the Icone 2016 award for her activities.

She first served as Secretary General to the Ministry of Fisheries. In 2017, she was appointed head of the Senegal National Agency for Maritime Affairs (ANAM).

In April 2019, she was appointed as the Minister of Digital Economy and Telecommunication (succeeding Abdoulaye Baldé) as well as Spokeswoman of the Government.

References

21st-century Senegalese women politicians
21st-century Senegalese politicians
Economy ministers of Senegal
Women government ministers of Senegal
Senegalese engineers
People from Thiès
Living people
Year of birth missing (living people)
Women engineers